Shilanand Lakra (born 5 May 1999) is an Indian field hockey player who plays as a forward for the Indian national team.

He made his national debut during the 2018 Sultan Azlan Shah Cup. He had previously played for the national junior team which won the bronze medal at the 2017 Sultan of Johor Cup. He was the top goalscorer at the 2019 Sultan of Johor Cup with five goals.

References

External links
Shilanand Lakra at Hockey India

1999 births
Living people
People from Sundergarh district
Field hockey players from Odisha
Indian male field hockey players
Male field hockey forwards